Presidential elections were held in El Salvador on 29 January 1848. Doroteo Vasconcelos ran unopposed and was elected by the legislature.

Results

References

El Salvador
President
Election and referendum articles with incomplete results
Presidential elections in El Salvador
Single-candidate elections